Daniel Anthony D'Aniello (born September 14, 1946) is an American billionaire businessman. He is the cofounder and chairman of the Carlyle Group, a private equity firm headquartered in Washington, D.C.

Biography

Early life
D'Aniello grew up in an Italian-American family in Butler, Pennsylvania, and graduated from Butler Senior High School. He graduated from Syracuse University magna cum laude in 1968, where he was a member of Beta Gamma Sigma, an honor society for business students and scholars. He received an MBA from the Harvard Business School in 1974, where he was a Teagle Foundation Fellow.

Career
He was a financial officer at PepsiCo and TWA. He was later vice president for finance and development at the Marriott Corporation. He was responsible for the valuation of major mergers, acquisitions, divestitures, debt and equity offerings, and project financings.

In 1987, he co-founded the Carlyle Group with William E. Conway Jr., and David Rubenstein. He now serves as chairman of the board.

He is on the board of trustees of the American Enterprise Institute, and on the board of trustees of his alma mater, Syracuse University, and on the corporate advisory council of its Martin J. Whitman School of Management and the IVMF advisory board.

In July 2017, D'Aniello was awarded the Arents Award, Syracuse University's highest alumni honor, as well as the honorary Doctor of Humane Letters in 2021.

Philanthropy
Daniel and Gayle D'Aniello support the Washington National Opera. The couple has donated over $50 million to Syracuse University in support of the construction and endowment of the Daniel and Gayle D’Aniello Building, the National Veterans Resource Center (NVRC), and the Institute for Veterans and Military Families.

Personal life
He lives in Vienna, Virginia with his wife, Gayle. Together they have two daughters.

References

1946 births
Living people
20th-century American businesspeople
21st-century American businesspeople
American people of Italian descent
American billionaires
American chief executives of financial services companies
American chief financial officers
American Enterprise Institute
American financiers
American financial analysts
American investors
American money managers
Businesspeople from Pennsylvania
The Carlyle Group people
Harvard Business School alumni
People from Butler County, Pennsylvania
PepsiCo people
Private equity and venture capital investors
Martin J. Whitman School of Management alumni
Syracuse University trustees